Mehmood Ali is a Pakistani footballer, who has played for the Pakistan national football team.

His current club is WAPDA FC.

References

Pakistani footballers
Pakistan international footballers
Living people
Association football midfielders
Year of birth missing (living people)